The Sirio class of patrol vessels consists of two units operated by the Italian Navy named Costellazioni II series or Nuove Unità di Pattugliamento d'Altura (NUPA). These vessels were financed by the Italian Department of Transport and Navigation, under law 413/1998, for maritime economic zone surveillance, antipollution, and rescue operations.

Description
The construction of these units is based largely on that of the Nuove Unità Minori Combattenti (NUMC); the hull and superstructure incorporate stealth features. The NUMC and Nuove Unità di Pattugliamento d'Altura (NUPA) share logistics, interoperability, features of the combat system and integrated telecommunications systems.

Each unit has two Wärtsilä NSD- W12-26 V-XN diesel engines providing  to two variable-pitch propellers. Three Isotta Fraschini 1708 T2 M2  diesel generators each power the on-board electronics.

The armament consists of two Oerlikon KBA-Alenia Oto Melara /80 guns with the provision to bow mount an OTO Melara /62 Super Rapid gun. Each unit can embark a single helicopter, either an AB-212 ASW or SH-90A NFH, but the ships lack hangars. For antipollution roles, vessels are fitted with: skimmers,  of recovered oils tankers,  of chemical dispersants and one chemical laboratory.

Ships
The two units, built in Muggiano and Riva Trigoso bear the names of two World War II torpedo boats of the Italian Royal Navy. These units operate in conjunction with NUMC COMSQUAPAT1 of COMFORPAT, the Forces Command patrol for surveillance and Coastal Defence and have their operational base in Augusta. They serve as coastal patrol and traffic control, cargo and surveillance in immigration control.

References

External links

 Pattugliatori Classe Sirio (PBH) Marina Militare website

Ships built by Fincantieri
Patrol ship classes
2002 ships
Patrol vessels of the Italian Navy